Jarrad Boumann (born 18 August 1989) is a former Australian rules footballer who played for the Hawthorn Football Club in the Australian Football League (AFL).

Boumann was drafted in from Box Hill as part of a trade deal with Greater Western Sydney and, at only 22, after a few fruitless years on the Western Bulldogs' list.

Boumann made his debut in round 1, against . After a  game against , he reported stomach pains.  Boumann  had surgery to remove his appendix. Boumann later injured his hand in a fight outside a city nightclub on 22 July 2012. Boumann has told club officials he punched one of his attackers in self-defence, fracturing his hand. Police have begun investigating the incident, which occurred near the corner of Exhibition and Lonsdale streets as Boumann and a friend tried to hail a taxi about 2.45am. Boumann says he was kicked repeatedly. Two men were arrested and questioned about 45 minutes later.

Boumann was announced delisted by the Hawks as of the 12 October 2012.

Boumann currently plays for East Wagga Kooringal Hawks Football Club

Statistics

|- style=background:#EAEAEA
| 2008 ||  || 32
| 0 || — || — || — || — || — || — || — || — || — || — || — || — || — || — || 0
|-
| 2009 ||  || 32
| 0 || — || — || — || — || — || — || — || — || — || — || — || — || — || — || 0
|- style=background:#EAEAEA
| 2010 ||  || 32
| 0 || — || — || — || — || — || — || — || — || — || — || — || — || — || — || 0
|-
| 2012 ||  || 31
| 2 || 0 || 0 || 3 || 7 || 10 || 1 || 5 || 0.0 || 0.0 || 1.5 || 3.5 || 5.0 || 0.5 || 2.5 || 0
|- class="sortbottom"
! colspan=3| Career
! 2 !! 0 !! 0 !! 3 !! 7 !! 10 !! 1 !! 5 !! 0.0 !! 0.0 !! 1.5 !! 3.5 !! 5.0 !! 0.5 !! 2.5 !! 0
|}

Honours and achievements
Team
 Minor premiership: 2012

References

External links

1989 births
Living people
Hawthorn Football Club players
Australian rules footballers from Victoria (Australia)
Dandenong Stingrays players
Box Hill Football Club players